Sri Suriyendra (1767–1836) was the queen of Siam, wife of Phutthaloetla Naphalai, who was her cousin, and mother of Mongkut and Pinklao. She was later named, upon the coronation of her son Mongkut, as Krom Somdet Phra Sri Suriyendramataya.

Princess Bunrot was a daughter of Princess Sri Sudarak (เจ้าฟ้ากรมพระศรีสุดารักษ์) (sister of Phutthayotfa Chulalok) and her Chinese husband Ngoen Saetan. Princess Bunrot lived with her mother in the Grand Palace and grew up with her maternal female cousins, the daughters of Phutthayotfa Chulalok.

Princess Bunrot had an affair with her cousin, Prince Isarasundhorn, son and heir apparent to King Phutthayotfa Chulalok. In 1801, the King discovered the princess' four-month pregnancy and banished her from the Grand Palace to live with her brother Prince Thepharirak.  Prince Isarasundhorn begged his father to no avail to return the princess to the palace. The couple eventually settled at the Old Palace (Thonburi Palace) and Princess Bunrot became the prince's consort. The baby died however, shortly after birth. With Prince Isarasundhorn (the future Phutthaloetla Naphalai), she bore three sons:

 The first, born in 1801, died shortly after birth;
 Prince Mongkut, or later King Mongkut (or King Rama IV), born in 1804;
 Prince Chutamani, or later King Pinklao, born in 1808.

Following Prince Isarasundhorn's coronation as Phutthaloetla Naphalai, Princess Bunrot was raised to the rank of queen. She was not the only wife since the Siamese monarchs were allowed have many consorts in accordance with tradition. Sri Suriyendra shared her husband with Princess Consort Kunthon and Princess Riam (Mother of King Nangklao (or King Rama III)) and a number of the king's concubines.

Her son, Prince Mongkut became a monk in 1824, the same year that Phutthaloetla Naphalai died. It was her son Mongkut who was to be crowned according to tradition. However, the nobility decided to offer the crown to Prince Tub, who became King Nangklao (Rama III) (the Prince was a son of concubine, but had been extremely experienced in government). Mongkut then remained a monk to avoid court intrigues.

Sri Suriyendra then left the Grand Palace for the Old Palace (Wang Derm) to live with her son Prince Isaret (previously Prince Chutamani). She stayed there until her death in 1836, and she did not live to see her son Mongkut crowned.

Ancestry

References

External links
 THE RATTANAKOSIN PERIOD
 Queens and main Consorts of the Chakri Dynasty

Srisuriyendra
18th-century Thai women
18th-century Chakri dynasty
19th-century Thai women
19th-century Chakri dynasty
1767 births
1836 deaths
Queen mothers
People from Samut Songkhram province
Thai female Chao Fa
Thai princesses consort